Sisters is a 1922 American silent drama film directed by Albert Capellani and starring Seena Owen, Gladys Leslie and Matt Moore.

Plot summary

Cast
 Seena Owen as 	Alix Strickland
 Gladys Leslie as 	Cherry Strickland
 Mildred Arden as 	Anna Little
 Matt Moore as Peter Joyce
 Joe King as 	Martin Lloyd
 Tom Guise as Dr. Strickland
 Robert Schable as 	Justin Little
 Frances Miller as Colored Mammy 
 Fred Miller as Colored Servant

References

Bibliography
 Connelly, Robert B. The Silents: Silent Feature Films, 1910-36, Volume 40, Issue 2. December Press, 1998.
 Munden, Kenneth White. The American Film Institute Catalog of Motion Pictures Produced in the United States, Part 1. University of California Press, 1997.

External links
 
 
 
 

1922 films
1922 drama films
1920s English-language films
American silent feature films
Silent American drama films
American black-and-white films
Films directed by Albert Capellani
1920s American films